Cabo Polonio is a hamlet located in the eastern coast of Uruguay in the Rocha Department.

Cabo Polonio has no roads leading to it and is located about 7 km from the main highway.  It is accessible by walking through the dunes or by 4×4 vehicles. The region has no electricity or running water for the few  houses of this town, and wind power and a few generators are used to power some of the posadas and grocery store.  There is a lighthouse that gets power from the national grid.  Residents obtain water from nearby water wells or collecting rain water.

Population
According to the 2011 census, it had a population of 95 inhabitants.

Features
Cabo Polonio sits on the tip of a peninsula that extends into the Atlantic Ocean. The ocean side of the peninsula experiences strong waves, while the bay interior to the peninsula is sheltered. At the top end, a lighthouse stands over boulders tumbling into the sea. Three small, rocky islands dot the coast nearby.

Near to the village is a colony of sea lions.  The shore also has mobile sand dunes, in which the sand is blown by the wind and the dunes change their position over time. The village land is shared by the Uruguayan government and private owners. The government has included the area into the SNAP (Sistema Nacional de Áreas Protegidas) National System of Protected Areas.

In popular culture 
Cabo Polonio is the setting for events spread over a 36-year period in Carolina de Robertis' novel Cantoras.

References

External links 

 Cabo Polonio website
 Portal de Cabo Polonio english version
 Systema Nacional de Áreas Protegidas de Uruguay, Cabo Polonio
INE map of Cabo Polonio

Headlands of Uruguay
Populated places in the Rocha Department
National parks of Uruguay
Beaches of Uruguay